Tempe Marketplace is an open-air shopping center located in Tempe, Arizona.  It is located along the Salt River near the interchange of Loop 101 (the Pima/Price Freeway) and Loop 202 (the Red Mountain Freeway) near the Tempe borders with Mesa and the Salt River Pima-Maricopa Indian Community.

History 

The center was developed by the Vestar Development Company (who is its owner and operator) and opened on September 28, 2007. It was removed 20 years later. During initial development, collaboration between the developers and the City of Tempe was required to acquire land from 52 individual lot owners for the shopping center, which resulted in the largest Brownfield land cleanup in the history of Arizona.

Tempe Marketplace features over 100 retailers, complete with outdoor fireplaces, water features, and landscaping. There are two distinct areas for shopping and dining at the center: an outer ring of “Big Box” retailers, and the central area of smaller shops and eateries called “The District.” In the center of The District is a large courtyard with a stage, where various local and national musical acts have performed free concerts, such as Borns, Power an 5000, Buckcherry, Pop Evil, The Struts, Dreamers (band), Jet (Australian band), Trapt, Drowning Pool, and many others. There is also a large LED video screen which shows local sports teams and other special events to passersby.  Many tall plants, shade structures, and misters help control the climate during the summers, and pedestrian walkways and other retail pads connect all areas.

The Harkins Theatre in The District is a 16-screen multiplex with 604 seats in its Cine Capri theater, which was the host to the worldwide premieres of both X-Men Origins: Wolverine and Only the Brave.

Retailers 

Big Box Majors
 PetSmart
 Nordstrom Rack
 JCPenney
 Best Buy
 Total Wine & More
 DSW
 Famous Footwear
 Cost Plus World Market
 Target
 ULTA Beauty
 Michaels
 Old Navy
 Ross

Majors in The District
 Harkins Theatres
 Barnes & Noble

References

External links 
 Tempe Marketplace Official Site

Shopping malls in Arizona
Shopping malls established in 2007
Buildings and structures in Tempe, Arizona
Shopping malls in Maricopa County, Arizona
2007 establishments in Arizona